Earth3D was developed as part of a diploma thesis of Dominique Andre Gunia at 
Braunschweig University of Technology to display a virtual globe of the earth. It was developed before Google bought Keyhole, Inc and changed their product into Google Earth. Earth3D downloads its data (satellite imagery and height data) from a server while the user navigates around. The data itself is saved in a Quadtree. It uses data from NASA, USGS, the CIA and the city of Osnabrück.

One of the strengths of Earth3D is the capacity of showing meteorological phenomena, like Low-pressure areas, anticyclones, etc. in near-real time.

The original version of Earth3D was developed using Trolltech's QT framework. Later a version built with Java and JOGL was developed. But the demand for a Java-based version was very little. This may be because NASA's WorldWind also has an open source Java version. So most people wanted to use a C++ based globe in their applications. That was the reason why a minimalized version, the Earth3dlib was developed. It contains only the most necessary functions to display the earth itself and to add own visualizations to it.

All these three projects can be retrieved from SourceForge's CVS (C++) or Subversion (Java) repository.

See also
 Marble, a free software of a virtual globe that allows the user to choose among the Earth, the Moon, Venus, Mars and other planets.
 World Wind, virtual Earth globe open-source developed by NASA.
 OpenStreetMap, collaborative project to create free and editable maps.
 Comparison of web map services
 Neogeography

References

External links 
 
World 3D Maps Earth

Free software programmed in C++
Free software programmed in Java (programming language)
Virtual globes
Programming tools for Windows
MacOS programming tools